The 31st Infantry Division (31-ya Pekhotnaya Diviziya) was an infantry formation of the Russian Imperial Army.

Organization
The 31st Infantry Division was part of the 10th Army Corps.
1st Brigade
121st Infantry Regiment
122nd Infantry Regiment
2nd Brigade
123rd Infantry Regiment
124th Infantry Regiment
31st Artillery Brigade

Commanders
1912-1914: Nikolai Protopopov

Chiefs of Staff
1899-1901: Vladislav Klembovsky

Commanders of the 2nd Brigade
1901-1903: Leonid Artamonov
February 11-May 6, 1917: Oleksander Osetsky

References

Infantry divisions of the Russian Empire
Military units and formations disestablished in 1918